The Alaska Gateway School District is a public school district based in Tok, Alaska (USA).

Schools
There are seven schools in the Alaska Gateway School District as well as a district-wide Correspondence School.

Dot Lake School (K-12; Dot Lake)
Eagle School (K-12; Eagle)
Mentasta Lake Katie John School (K-12; Mentasta Lake)
Walter Northway School (K-12; Northway)
Tanacross School (K-8; Tanacross)
Tok School (K-12; Tok)
Tetlin School (K-12; Tetlin)
AGSD Correspondence Study

Enrollment
2007–2008 school year: 411 students
2006–2007 school year: 421 students
2005–2006 school year: 427 students
2004–2005 school year: 448 students
2003–2004 school year: 502 students

Demographics
There were a total of 411 students enrolled in the Alaska Gateway School District during the 2007-2008 school year. Of these, 405 were enrolled in grades K-12 and 6 were pre-elementary (early childhood) students. The racial makeup of the district was 58.15% Alaska Native, 38.44% White, 1.22% Asian, 0.97% African American, 0.97% Hispanic, and 0.24% American Indian.

See also
List of school districts in Alaska

References

External links
Alaska Gateway School District

School districts in Alaska
Southeast Fairbanks Census Area, Alaska
Education in Unorganized Borough, Alaska